Steven Blaney  (born April 8, 1965) is a Canadian businessman and Conservative politician. He served as the Minister of Public Safety Canada (July 15, 2013 – November 4, 2015) and previously as the Minister of Veterans Affairs and Minister of State for La Francophonie in the cabinet of Prime Minister Stephen Harper (May 18, 2011 – July 14, 2013). He has represented the Québec riding of Lévis—Bellechasse in the Canadian House of Commons since the 2006 federal election. Despite his anglophone-sounding name, Blaney is a Francophone. He was reelected in the 2015 election. In 2017, he unsuccessfully ran for Conservative party leader.

Early life
Blaney was born in Sherbrooke, Quebec, and was raised in Sainte-Marie-de-Beauce. Today, he lives in Lévis along with his wife, Marie Bouchard, and his two children, William-Antoine and Alexandra. 
For 15 years, he worked in Quebec's engineering sector, more particularly in water purification and energy efficiency. Blaney started up two companies specializing in environmental technology and carried out many environmental projects.
Blaney was an active member of Réseau Environnement, Canada's largest group of environmental professionals; he presided over the organization's Québec-Chaudière-Appalaches chapter between 2003 and 2006.

Political career

Provincial politics
Blaney entered politics during the Quebec general elections of 1998; he was a candidate of the Action démocratique du Québec in the provincial electoral district of Beauce-Nord. Blaney arrived in third place, behind Normand Poulin (PLQ) and Gaston Gourde (PQ), collecting 14.42% of the votes.

Federal politics
Following many years of activity with the Conservative Party in Quebec, Blaney decided to run for the first time for a seat at the House of Commons during the 2006 federal elections in the riding of Lévis-Bellechasse. He successfully defeated Bloc Québécois incumbent Réal Lapierre with 46.40% of the votes. Blaney joined nine other Quebec MPs in Ottawa, following the Conservative Party breakthrough in Quebec that year.

After his victory in 2006, Blaney was appointed vice-president of the Quebec Conservative caucus. On May 31, 2007, he was selected as Chair of the Standing Committee on Official Languages; a position that he held till September 2010.

Moreover, he joined various other committees, ranging from Indian Affairs to Industry, Science and Technology, including the Environment and Sustainable Development Committee. In January 2006, Blaney visited Canadian soldiers in Kandahar as part of a trip organized by the Standing Committee on National Defence for its members. He is also vice-chair of the Canada-France Interparliamentary Association.

After his reelection in 2008, Blaney became the new President of the Quebec Conservative caucus. Furthermore, he promised to offset the greenhouse gas emissions resulting from his activities through tree planting, in cooperation with Tree Canada and the Comité de restauration de la rivière Etchemin, thus becoming the first carbon neutral MP.

On May 2, 2011, Blaney was re-elected for a third mandate as representative of Lévis-Bellechasse at the House of Commons earning 43.95% of the votes, beating the NDP candidate with more than 10% of the votes, receiving 1065 more votes than during the 2008 election.

Minister of Veterans Affairs 

On May 18, 2011, Blaney was appointed to the cabinet of Prime Minister Stephen Harper. He assumed the position of Minister of Veterans Affairs taking over this role from Jean-Pierre Blackburn, who was defeated in the May 2 election. Blaney also sits as a member of the Cabinet Committee on Social Affairs and the Cabinet Committee on Foreign Affairs and Defence.
Blaney carried on the policies launched by his two conservative predecessors. During the summer following the elections, Blaney announced regulatory changes to the Enhanced Veterans Charter Act to revamp the pension system that was set up following World War I and World War II. The New Veterans Charter (NVC) was designed to provide Veterans with the support they required to successfully transition from military to civilian life.

As Minister of Veterans Affairs, Blaney can be credited for improving the benefits and services for Veterans suffering from severe diagnosed medical conditions or/and disabilities. He also launched the Helmet to Hardhats Program which assists many former Canadian Forces members to find well-paid jobs in the construction sector. 
Preoccupied by the modernization of Veterans Affairs Canada, Blaney initiated the Cutting Red Tape for Veterans initiative aimed at simplifying administrative processes for Veterans and at making all of Veterans Affairs Canada's forms and decisions comprehensible for all.

In March 2011, Blaney told a meeting of seniors, "Et rappelez-vous, le ciel est bleu, l'enfer est rouge!" (And remember—Heaven is blue, Hell is red!), referring to the colours of the Conservative and Liberal parties. The slogan was used by the government of Maurice Duplessis in the mid-20th century during the period of church-state collaboration in Quebec known as the Grande Noirceur.

Minister of Public Safety 

On July 15, 2013, Blaney assumed the position of Minister of Public Safety, taking over this role from Vic Toews who announced his retirement on July 9, 2013. The announcement of the appointment was made during Prime Minister Stephen Harper's 2013 Cabinet shuffle.

On August 13, 2013, in response to a brief from Dennis Edney arguing that Omar Khadr should be held in a youth facility not an adult prison, because he was a minor when the crimes he was convicted of occurred, Blaney asserted that the  Harper government would fight to keep Khadr in adult prisoner for the full term of his sentence.

On January 30, 2015, Steven Blaney introduced Bill C-51, the Anti-terrorism Act, 2015.  This bill was tabled in response to jihadist terrorist attacks on Canada, namely the 2014 Saint-Jean-sur-Richelieu ramming attack and the 2014 shootings at Parliament Hill, Ottawa.

The Bill has 6 key elements, namely:

 Creating a criminal offence for the advocacy or promotion of terrorism,
 Allow judges to issue seizure orders for terrorist propaganda,
 Allow CSIS to engage in threat disruption,
 Enhance the Passenger Protect Program to stop known terrorists from boarding planes,
 Lower the threshold for obtaining terrorism-related peace bond, and
 Enable the sharing of national security information across relevant agencies

Notably, during the debate on this legislation, Blaney said “the important point that often seems to be forgotten around this place, that it is the jihadis who represent a threat, not our police officers and those protecting us”.

The legislation received Royal Assent on June 18, 2015.

On October 7, 2014, Steven Blaney introduced Bill C-42, the Common Sense Firearms Licensing Act.  There were eight measures designed to make Canada's firearms laws more safe and sensible.  These measures included:

 A six-month grace period at the end of the five-year licence period to stop people from immediately becoming criminalized for paperwork delays around license renewals;
 Streamline the licensing system by eliminating the Possession Only Licence (POL) and converting all existing POLs to Possession and Acquisition Licences (PALs);
 Make classroom participation in firearms safety training mandatory for first-time licence applicants;
 Amend the Criminal Code to strengthen the provisions relating to orders prohibiting the possession of firearms where a person is convicted of an offence involving domestic violence;
 End needless paperwork around Authorizations to Transport by making them a condition of a licence for certain routine and lawful activities;
 Provide for the discretionary authority of Chief Firearms Officers to be subject to limit by regulation;
 Authorize firearms import information sharing when restricted and prohibited firearms are imported into Canada by businesses; and,
 Allow the Government to have the final say on classification decisions, following the receipt of independent expert advice.

These measures were supported by hunting and outdoors groups from across the country, such as the Ontario Federation of Anglers and Hunters.  They were also supported by many frontline law enforcement officers.

Opposition
He was re-elected in the 2015 election. On October 14, 2016, Blaney announced that he was running for the leadership of the Conservative Party of Canada, though he eventually lost to Andrew Scheer. Blaney came 9th out of 14 candidates. During his leadership campaign he ran on Supporting banning the wearing of the niqab while voting, taking the citizenship oath, or by federal public servants, even if such a ban would require invoking the notwithstanding clause of the Constitution in order to override the Charter of Rights and Freedoms. Also advocates testing of would-be citizens on "their understanding and appreciation of Canada's core principles."

Electoral record

Federal

Provincial

References

External links

Steven Blaney MP official site

1965 births
Conservative Party of Canada MPs
Francophone Quebec people
Members of the Cabinet of Canada
Living people
Members of the 28th Canadian Ministry
Members of the House of Commons of Canada from Quebec
Members of the King's Privy Council for Canada
People from Lévis, Quebec
Politicians from Sherbrooke
Université de Sherbrooke alumni
Université du Québec à Montréal alumni